Västerbotten, known in English as West Bothnia or Westrobothnia, is a province (landskap) in the north of Sweden, bordering Ångermanland, Lapland, North Bothnia, and the Gulf of Bothnia. It is known for the cheese named after the province.

Administration 
The traditional provinces of Sweden serve no administrative or political purposes, but are historical and cultural entities. The administrative county, Västerbotten County, consists of the province and the southern part of Swedish Lappland.

Heraldry
On 18 January 1884, all provinces gained the rights to the rank of duchy, and the arms can be represented with a ducal coronet. Blazon: "Azure Seme of Mullets Or a Reindeer in full course and hoofed Gules."

Geography 
Västerbotten was historically divided into chartered cities and districts.

Cities
Umeå (1622)
Skellefteå (1845)

Communes/Municipality Västerbottens län

Towns and villages
 

Björksele

Facts
Highest mountain: Åmliden (550 meters)
Largest lake: Bygdeträsket

History 

Up until the Finnish War 1808–1809, and the Treaty of Fredrikshamn, the province of Västerbotten also included a small portion of the extreme north of current Finland. This part has later been integrated in Lapland, Finland. The Österbotten, Eastern Botten or Ostrobothnia, lay on the Finnish side of the sea, and this province name still survives.

Following the Fredrikshamn treaty, which re-defined the outlines and orientation of Sweden, in 1810, Västerbotten County was split in two parts. The northern portion became Norrbotten County, and the Swedish-speaking locals of Norrbotten (which in itself is a multi-lingual area) soon began referring to themselves as Norrbothnians. The county borders thus gradually led to a local provincial identity. Nowadays Norrbotten is considered a separate province, even though provinces had ceased to have any administrative or legal significance hundreds of years before 1810.

Västerbotten Regiment was the provincial regiment.

Dukes of Västerbotten 
Since the 13th century, Swedish princes in some dynasties have been created dukes of various provinces. Since 1772, these are only nominal titles.
 Prince Gustaf Adolf (1906-1947)

Geography

Lakes and watercourses

Sports
Regional football in the province is administered by Västerbottens Fotbollförbund. Ice hockey is also popular, with IF Björklöven and Skellefteå AIK.

References

External links 
Västerbotten.se
Västerbotten.net

 
Provinces of Sweden